The Kernhofer Gscheid Pass (el. 970 m.) is a high mountain pass in the Austrian Alps in the Bundesland of Lower Austria.

It connects Kernhof in the Traisen River valley with Terz in the Salza River valley near Mariazell. The road has a maximum grade of 13 percent.

At the pass is a small church and the Gschaid Restaurant. To the west, a winding road leads to Annaberg and into the Ötscher Nature Park.

Directly south of the pass lies the massive Göller (1766 m.), and five km north the Tirolerkogel (1377 m.).

See also
 List of highest paved roads in Europe
 List of mountain passes

Mountain passes of the Alps
Mountain passes of Lower Austria
Mürzsteg Alps